Athysanus is a monotypic genus whose only species is Athysanus pusillus, the common sandweed.

Description 
It is an annual herb with long, spindly stems on which grow small, unassuming white flowers. The tiny fruits that emerge from the flowers are flat, circular, green, and fringed with prominent white hairs. It may grow up to 15 cm tall and flowers between April–May.

Distribution 
It is native to the western United States and into British Columbia.

Habitat 
Found in moist shallow soil along the slopes and cliffs in lower mountain zones.

References

External links 
 USDA Plants Profile
 Jepson Manual Treatment
 Photo of the fruits

Brassicaceae

Plants described in 1836
Flora of the Western United States
Flora of British Columbia